Eleonora Alekseevna Romanova (born 17 August 1998) is a Russian (since September 2016) and former Ukrainian individual rhythmic gymnast. She is the 2013 Ukrainian national junior champion.

Career

Junior
Romanova began appearing in international junior competitions in the 2011 Season. She won team silver at the 2012 Kiev World Cup. Romanova together with teammate Anastasiia Mulmina competed at the 2012 European Junior Championships, she qualified to 2 event finals (6th in hoop and 8th in ribbon).

In 2013 Season, Romanova started her season competing at the 2013 Moscow Grand Prix where she won the all-around silver medal behind Russia's Yulia Bravikova. She won the all-around bronze at the 2013 Irina Deleanu Cup and won the Ukrainian National Junior championships. Romanova briefly competed as member of the Ukrainian group that competed at the 2013 European Junior Championships in Vienna, Austria. On October 25–27, Romanova competed at the World Club Championship, the 2013 Aeon Cup in Tokyo, Japan representing team Deriugina school where she won the junior all-around bronze medal and (together with Senior teammates Ganna Rizatdinova and Viktoria Mazur) won the team bronze.

Senior
In 2014 Season, Romanova competed in the senior international division at the 2014 Holon Grand Prix finishing 7th in all-around, she qualified to 2 event finals (bronze in ball, 7th in hoop). Romanova appeared in her first World Cup assignment at the 2014 Minsk World Cup finishing 18th in all-around and went to qualify in the clubs final. She finished 4th in all-around at the Ukrainian National Championships behind Anastasiia Mulmina. On September 22–28, Romanova (along with teammates Ganna Rizatdinova and Viktoria Mazur) represented Ukraine at the 2014 World Championships where they took the Team bronze with a total of 135.515 points. On October 17–19, Romanova traveled in Tokyo for the 2014 Aeon Cup, representing team Deriugina school club (together with teammates Ganna Rizatdinova and junior Mariia Mulyk) won the team bronze. She finished 9th in the All-around finals behind Azerbaijan's Marina Durunda. Romanova competed at the 2014 Grand Prix Final in Innsbruck where she finished 6th in all-around. She qualified to all 4 event finals, finishing 6th in hoop, clubs, ribbon and 5th in ball.

In 2015 Season, Romanova's first competition was at the 2015 L.A. Lights where she finished 5th in the all-around. At the 2015 Valentine Cup, she won bronze medals in the all around, hoop, ball and placed 4th in clubs and ribbon. On March 14–15, Romanova competed at the 2015 Baltic Hoop finishing 5th in all-around, she took silver in ball and bronze in hoop finals. On March 27–29, Romanova competed at the 2015 Lisboa World Cup finishing 11th in the all-around. On April 10–12, Romanova finished 16th in the all-around at the 2015 Pesaro World Cup. Romanova with teammates (Ganna Rizatdinova, Viktoria Mazur) competed at the 2015 European Championships where Team Ukraine won bronze. Romanova competed at the 2015 Holon Grand Prix finishing 12th in all-around and qualified to 1 event final. On June 15–21, Romanova competed at the inaugural 2015 European Games where she finished 16th in the all-around. In August, Romanova finished 18th in the all-around at the 2015 Sofia World Cup behind Varvara Filiou. On September 9–13, Romanova (together with teammates Ganna Rizatdinova and Viktoria Mazur) competed at the 2015 World Championships in Stuttgart, with Team Ukraine taking bronze. Romanova also dramatically qualifies to the individual all-around finals (0,008 points ahead of Viktoria Mazur), but misses it due to the foot injury (she was substituted by Viktoria Mazur).

In February 2016, Romanova unexpectedly disappeared from the Deriugina School of Rhythmic Gymnastics and the Ukrainian Rhythmic Gymnastics National Team (which led to a scandal in the Ukrainian RG Federation). The Ukrainian media said that parents took her away from Ukraine and that she allegedly decided to change her nationality to compete for the Russian Federation. However, in late 2016 it was confirmed that Romanova was granted Russian citizenship. Romanova is currently trained by Evgenia Kanaeva, and was originally set to compete for Russia in 2017 - however, since Ukraine disagreed with letting her change nationality, Romanova is to wait until 2018 when her current FIG License expires before she is allowed to compete for Russia where she will renew her FIG License.

Routine music information

Competitive Highlights

References

External links

 
 

1998 births
Living people
People from Krasnodon
Ukrainian rhythmic gymnasts
Deriugins Gymnasts
European Games competitors for Ukraine
Gymnasts at the 2015 European Games
Medalists at the Rhythmic Gymnastics World Championships
Medalists at the Rhythmic Gymnastics European Championships
Russian rhythmic gymnasts
Ukrainian emigrants to Russia
Naturalised citizens of Russia
Sportspeople from Luhansk Oblast